USS Needlefish has been the name of more than one United States Navy ship, and may refer to:

 , a submarine cancelled in July 1944 before she was laid down
 , a submarine cancelled in August 1945 before she was laid down
 A fictitious USS Needlefish is mentioned in Edward L. Beach's novel Run Silent, Run Deep.

United States Navy ship names